Igor Ferreira Rocha (born 4 March 1993) is a Portuguese footballer who plays for Valadares Gaia Futebol Clube as a goalkeeper.

Club career
Born in Argoncilhe, Santa Maria da Feira, Rocha played for a host of clubs as a youth, finishing his development with C.D. Nacional after joining in 2011. In the 2011–12 season he started training with the first team, but only managed five bench appearances during his one-year stint with the Madeirans.

In the summer of 2012, Rocha signed for F.C. Arouca of the second division. On 18 May 2013, the last day of the campaign, he made his debut as a professional, starting in a 2–4 away loss against C.D. Tondela.

Rocha's input in the Primeira Liga consisted of one minute in a 0–1 defeat at C.F. Belenenses, after coming on as a substitute for Rui Sacramento in the last matchday. He acted as third-choice during his spell at the Estádio Municipal de Arouca.

References

External links

National team data 

1993 births
Living people
Portuguese footballers
Association football goalkeepers
Primeira Liga players
Liga Portugal 2 players
Segunda Divisão players
FC Porto players
Padroense F.C. players
C.D. Nacional players
F.C. Arouca players
Portugal youth international footballers
Sportspeople from Santa Maria da Feira